The Reserve Division of Dezhou was activated on August 29, 1983, in Dezhou, Shandong. The division was then composed of:
1st Regiment - Yucheng County
2nd Regiment - Ling County
3rd Regiment - Wucheng County
Artillery Regiment - Pingyuan County

On February 1, 1986, the division was redesignated as the Reserve Infantry Division of Dezhou().

In October 1999, the division was reorganized as the Reserve Logistic Support Brigade of Shandong().

References

Reserve divisions of the People's Liberation Army
Military units and formations established in 1983